Dul Hasti is a 390 MW hydroelectric power plant in Kishtwar district of Jammu and Kashmir, India built by NHPC. The power plant is a run-of-the-river type on the Chenab River, in the Kishtwar region, a rugged, mountainous section of the Himalayas, and several hundred kilometers from larger cities. The project provides peaking power to the Northern Grid with beneficiary states being Jammu and Kashmir, Punjab, Haryana, Uttar Pradesh, Uttarakhand, Rajasthan, Delhi and Union Territory of Chandigarh. It was constructed between 1985 and 2007.

Design
The Dul Hasti Hydro-Electric Project (HEP) involves a dam and a tunnel ending in a power plant at a bend in the Chenab River in the vicinity of Kishtwar. The dam is located at the village of Dul and the power plant at the village of Hasti, giving the name "Dul Hasti" to the project.

The Dam is 65 m high and 186 m long. It is equipped with low-level gated spillways which can be used to flush silt load.

Background
Begun in 1985, the Dulhasti Power project, set in the northern Indian provinces of Jammu and Kashmir, represents an example of a disaster in project cost estimation and delivery. As initially conceived, the project's cost was estimated at 1.6 billion rupees (about $50 million). By the time the contract was let, the cost estimate had risen to 4.5 billion rupees and later successively to 8, 11, 16, and 24 billion rupees (nearly $750 million). The project became operational on 7 April 2007 and has been generating over 2000 Million Units of electricity per year.

Contracting and design
The contract for the power generation project was first awarded to a French consortium at a price of $50 million, who almost immediately asked for an upward price revision.
The site was intended to capitalize on the proximity to a large river systems capable of providing the water capacity needed to run a hydroelectric plant of Dulhasti's dimensions. Unfortunately, the site selected for the project came with some serious drawbacks as well. First, it was sited in the disputed border region between Pakistan and India. Jammu and Kashmir have been the epicenter of numerous and serious clashes between separatist forces demanding independence and Indian army . Constructing such an obvious target as a power plant in the disputed area was sure to provoke reaction by militant groups, using it as their chief means of opposition. Thus, the additional costs of providing security to the site quickly became prohibitively expensive. A second problem concerns the sheer geographical challenge of creating a large plant in a region almost totally devoid of supporting infrastructure, including an adequate logistics network (roads and rail lines). Building the plant in the foothills of the Himalayas may be scenic, but it is not cost effective, particularly as almost all supplies had to be brought in with air transportation, at exorbitant costs. All raw materials, including cement, wood, stone, and steel, had to be hauled by helicopter for miles over snowbound areas.Now it is the source of electricity for most of the states and the city.

See also

Ratle Hydroelectric Plant – under construction downstream

Notes

References

Bibliography

Further reading 

 Undue favours shown to French consortium in awarding Dulhasti Hydro-electric project, India Today, 31 March 1990.
 Escalating costs, militant attacks stall ambitious Rs 1,100 crore power project in Kashmir, India Today, 30 September 1994.
 Jaiprakash Ind Bags Civil Work Contract For Dulhasti, Business Stanard, 2 January 1997.
 Work resumes at India’s delayed Dul Hasti project, NS Energy, 10 June 1998.
 Minister requests speeding up of Dulhasti project, Water Power & Dam Construction, 22 November 2005.
 M. M. Madan, Longitudinal Joints in Dams- Some Case Studies, MMM Hydropower blogspot, retrieved 7 June 2021.

Hydroelectric power stations in Jammu and Kashmir
Dams in Jammu and Kashmir
Dams on the Chenab River
Run-of-the-river power stations
Dams completed in 2007
Energy infrastructure completed in 2007
Kishtwar district
2007 establishments in Jammu and Kashmir